The 1995 Notre Dame Fighting Irish football team represented the University of Notre Dame in the 1995 college football season. The team was coached by Lou Holtz and played its home games at Notre Dame Stadium in South Bend, Indiana.

Schedule

Roster

Game summaries

Northwestern

Purdue

Vanderbilt

Texas

Ohio State

Washington

Army

USC

Boston College

Navy

Air Force

1996 Orange Bowl

Awards and honors
 Former Fighting Irish player Red Sitko was inducted into the College Football Hall of Fame

References

Notre Dame
Notre Dame Fighting Irish football seasons
Notre Dame Fighting Irish football